Kevin Forde (born 22 November 1985) is a New Zealand cricketer. He played in one List A and two Twenty20 matches for Wellington in 2006 and 2007.

See also
 List of Wellington representative cricketers

References

External links
 

1985 births
Living people
New Zealand cricketers
Wellington cricketers
Cricketers from Invercargill